was a private university in Kumamoto, Kumamoto, Japan. The school was established in 1964 as a junior college and became a four-year college (School of Engineering) in 1973. The university opened a School of Agriculture on its Aso campus (Aso-gun, Kumamoto) in 1980. The university merged into Tokai University in 2008 and both campuses remain as Tokai University Kyushu Campuses (Kumamoto Campus and Aso Campus).

Teachers
Teruaki Georges Sumioka, Associate Professor of Management

External links
 Official website 

Educational institutions established in 1964
Universities and colleges in Kumamoto Prefecture
1964 establishments in Japan
Defunct private universities and colleges in Japan